John Burton (2 April 1944 – 22 May 2022) was a British conservationist and nature author.

In 1963, Burton became assistant information officer at the Natural History Museum. He was chief executive of the World Land Trust for 30 years. He held that position until 2019.

Burton was a regular columnist for the New Scientist and an Assistant Editor of Animals magazine (now BBC Wildlife Magazine).

Burton believed that veganism is not realistic from a conservationist view, but advocated for reduced meat and dairy. He described himself as a "largely vegetarian omnivore".

Works

 Burton, John A 1971 Extinct Animals London Transworld
 Burton, John A 1973 Birds of the Tropics London Orbis
 Burton, John A 1974 Fossils London Transworld
 Burton, John A 1975 The Naturalist in London Newton Abbot David & Charles
 Burton, John A (contributor) 1975 The Second Birdwatchers' Book Newton  Abbot D & C
 Burton, John A 1976 Nature in the City Danbury Press
 Burton, John A & B Risden 1976 The Love of Birds London Octopus
 Burton, John A (contributor) 1976 Wilderness Europe London Time-Life Books
 Burton, John A (Ed) 1976 Owls of the World London Peter Low
 Burton, John A 1977 Musical Instruments from Odds and Ends London Carousel
 Burton, John A (contributor) 1977 The World of Wildlife London Hamlyn
 Burton, John A 1978 Rare Animals London Transworld
 Arnold, E N & Burton, John A 1978 Field Guide to the Amphibians and Reptiles of Europe London Collins
 Burton, John A (contributor) 1978 Recent Advances in Primatology London Academic Press
 Burton, John A 1980 Gem Guide to Wild Animals London Collins
 Burton, John A 1982 Guinness Book of Mammals London Guinness
 Burton, John A (contributor) 1982 Encyclopedia of the Animal Kingdom London Optimum Books
 Burton, John A 1984 Gem Guide to Zoo Animals London Collins
 Burton, John A (ed) 1984 National Trust Book of Wild Animals London Cape
 Burton, John A (Ed) 1984 Owls of the World (2nd Ed) London Peter Low
 Burton, John A 1987 Collins Guide to Rare Mammals of the World London  Collins
 Scott, P, Burton, John A, & Fitter, R 1987 Red Data Books: The Historical Background IUCN/NEP
 Burton, John A 1988 Close to Extinction London Franklin Watts
 Burton, John A (consultant) 1988 Killing for Luxury London Franklin Watts
 Burton, John A (consultant) 1988 Wild Britain London Ebury Press
 Burton, John A 1989 Mammals of America New York Archcape Press
 Burton, John A (contributor) 1990 The Guinness Encyclopedia Enfield  Guinness Publishing
 Salvadori, F B, ed by Burton, John A 1990 Rare Animals of the World New  York Mallard Press
 Burton, John A 1991 Close to Extinction (2nd, rev. Ed) London Franklin  Watts
 Burton, John A 1991 Field Guide to the Mammals of Europe London Kingfisher
 Burton, John A 1991 The Pocket Guide to Mammals of North America London  Dragon's World
 Burton, John A (contributor) 1991 Animal Life New York OUP
 Burton, John A (contributor) 1991 The Global Zoo Amsterdam Time-Life Books
 Burton, John A (Ed) 1991 The Atlas of Endangered Species N Y Macmillan Inc
 Burton, John A 1992 Snakes an illustrated guide London Blandford
 Burton, John A (Ed) 1992 Owls of the World (3rd, Rev. Ed) London Peter Low
 Burton, John A 1993 Animals of the World London Harper Collins
 Burton, John A (consultant) 1994 Mammals London Dragon's World  Children's Books
 Burton, John A (contributor) 1994 Reader's Digest Exploring the Secrets of Nature Reader's Digest
 Burton, John A (coordinator) 1994 CITES Guide to Plants in Trade Bristol DoE
 Burton, John A (consultant) 1995 Wild Ireland London Sheldrake/Arum
 Burton, John A 1996 Jungles & Rainforests London Dragon's World
 Harris, B (Burton, John A, consultant) 1996 Oceans A fold out book Rand McNally
 Harris, B (Burton, John A, consultant) 1996 Rainforest A fold out book Rand McNally
 Burton, John A 1997 Gem Photographic Guide to European Wild Animals London Collins
 Burton, John A 1998 Collins Wild Guide Wild Animals (Europe) London HarperCollins
 Burton, John A 1998 Reptile London Dorling Kindersley
 Langton, T E & J A Burton 1998 Amphibians & Reptiles: Conservation  management of species & Habitats Strasbourg CoE
 Burton, John A (ed.) 1999 Atlas of Endangered Species 2nd ed., New York, Macmillan
 Burton, John A 2002 Field Guide to the Mammals of Europe (2nd ed., London, Kingfisher
 Bertrand, G A, Burton, John A and Paul Sterry 2002 Guide to North American Wildlife. HarperCollins. New York
 Burton, John A et al (eds) Wildlife And Roads: The Ecological Impact. Imperial College Press. London
 Burton, John A 2002 Attracting Wildlife to Your Garden. New Holland. London
 Burton, John A 2005 The Ultimate Bird Feeder handbook
 Burton, John A 2009 Gem Guide to Wild Animals (revised ed.)
 Burton, John A Jonny Birks and Don Jefferies 2018 Was the Stone Marten native to Britain? British Wildlife. Totnes.

References

External links

 World Land Trust

1944 births
2022 deaths
Employees of the Natural History Museum, London
English conservationists
English male non-fiction writers
English nature writers
Non-fiction environmental writers